Aspergillus labruscus is a species of fungus in the genus Aspergillus. It belongs to the group of black Aspergilli  that are used in industry to create enzymes and other products. It is from the Nigri section. The species was first described in 2017.

Growth and morphology

A. labruscus has been cultivated on both Czapek yeast extract agar (CYA) plates and Malt Extract Agar Oxoid® (MEAOX) plates. The growth morphology of the colonies can be seen in the pictures below.

References 

labruscus
Fungi described in 2017